Wyoming Highway 215 (WYO 215), Pine Bluffs-Albin Road, is a , two-lane state highway in Laramie County, Wyoming, United states, that connects Interstate 80 Business/U.S. Route 30 (I-80 BL/US 30) in Pine Bluffs with Wyoming Highway 216 , just east of Albin.

Route description
WYO 215 begins at I-80 BL/US 30 (Parson Street), just north of Exit 401 on Interstate 80/US 30 in southwestern Pine Bluffs. (I-80 BL/US 30 heads south toward Interstate 80 and north, then east, toward Nebraska, but I-80 BL no longer continues into that state.) From its southern terminus WYO 215 heads very briefly west on a viaduct over Old U.S. 30 and four sets of railway tracks as it turns north to run just inside the western edge of Pine Bluffs. After connecting with the western end of North Main Street, crossing over Lodgepole Creek, and connecting with the eastern end of County Road 213, WYO 215 leaves Pine Bluffs and continues north  through rural agricultural area for the greater part of its course.

About  farther north WYO 215 crosses County Road 218 and then County Road 219. After connecting with the western end of County Road 220 WYO 215 crosses County Road 221 and promptly passes to the west of a Minuteman missile silo. After crossing County Road 222, County Road 223, and County Road 224, WYO 215 connect with the western end of County Road 226.

(WYO 216 heads west through Albin before ending at U.S. Route 85, southwest of Meriden. WYO 216 heads east to the Nebraska state line. CR 162 head north toward Wyoming Highway 151 and La Grance.)

Major intersections

See also

 List of state highways in Wyoming

References

 Official 2003 State Highway Map of Wyoming

External links

 WYO 215 - I-80 Bus/US 30 to WYO 216
 Town of Pine Bluffs webpage

Transportation in Laramie County, Wyoming
215